Speak to Me of Love is a 2002 French drama film written and directed by Sophie Marceau and starring Judith Godrèche, Niels Arestrup, and Anne Le Ny. The first feature-length motion picture directed by actress Sophie Marceau, the film is about the breakup of a long-term relationship. Speak to Me of Love was filmed on location in New York City and Paris. In 2002, the film received the Montréal World Film Festival Award for Best Director (Sophie Marceau) and was nominated for the Grand Prix des Amériques.

Plot
Justine and Richard's fifteen-year relationship ends in separation due to irreconcilable differences with Justine maintaining custody of their three boys. Her new life means having to deal with being a single parent but at the same time, she comes to terms with her own parents' divorce and finds a common bond with her long-suffering mother. Richard, a renowned author, deals with the situation by devoting all his attention to his writing. Both are forced to confront their uncertain futures, while examining what led to the breakdown of their marriage.

Cast
 Judith Godrèche as Justine
 Niels Arestrup as Richard
 Anne Le Ny as Amélie
 Laurence Février as Justine's mother
 Jean-Marie Frin as Justine's father
 Aurélien Wiik as William
 Daniel Isoppo as Hubert
 Christelle Tual as Josée
 Chantal Banlier as Christine
 Isabelle Olive as Carole
 Jimmy Baudrand as Constantin
 Louis-Alexandre Lucotte as Jérémy
 Jules Boudier as Jacob
 Ariane Seguillon as Corinne
 Léa Unglick as Justine (5 years old)
 Lilly-Fleur Pointeaux as Justine (9–12 years old)
 Nastasia Demont as Clémentine (8 years old)
 James Gorter as Clément (8 years old)
 Annelise Hesme as Elsa
 Julien Marion as Justine's brother (14 years old)

Awards and nominations
 2002 Montreal World Film Festival Award for Best Director (Sophie Marceau)
 2002 Montreal World Film Festival Award Nomination for Grand Prix des Amériques (Sophie Marceau)

References

External links
 

2002 films
2002 drama films
Films directed by Sophie Marceau
Films produced by Alain Sarde
2002 directorial debut films
French drama films
2000s French-language films
2000s French films